Women's kabaddi at the 2014 Asian Games was held in Songdo Global University Gymnasium, Incheon, South Korea from 28 September to 3 October 2014.

Squads

Results
All times are Korea Standard Time (UTC+09:00)

Preliminary

Group A

Group B

Knockout round

Semifinals

Final

Final standing

References

Rosters

External links
Official website

W